Inaruwa may refer to:

Inaruwa, Kosi, headquarters of Sunsari District in Nepal
Inaruwa, Narayani, a village development committee in Rautahat District in the Narayani Zone of south-eastern Nepal